Pheia daphaena is a moth in the subfamily Arctiinae. It was described by George Hampson in 1898. It is found on Dominica, Santa Lucia, Martinique, Guadeloupe and Saint Martin.

References

Moths described in 1898
daphaena